Henri Paul Julien Dutilleux (22 January 1916 – 22 May 2013) was a French composer active mainly in the second half of the 20th century. His small body of published work, which garnered international acclaim, followed in the tradition of Maurice Ravel, Claude Debussy, Albert Roussel and Olivier Messiaen, but in an idiosyncratic, individual style.

Some of his notable compositions include a piano sonata, two symphonies, the cello concerto Tout un monde lointain… (A whole distant world), the violin concerto L'arbre des songes (The tree of dreams), the string quartet Ainsi la nuit (Thus the night) and a sonatine for flute and piano. Some of these are regarded as masterpieces of 20th-century classical music. Works were commissioned from him by such major artists as Charles Munch, George Szell, Mstislav Rostropovich, the Juilliard String Quartet, Isaac Stern, Paul Sacher, Anne-Sophie Mutter, Simon Rattle, Renée Fleming, and Seiji Ozawa. French organist Gaston Litaize also asked Dutilleux many times to compose for the organ, but nothing came from it; the two first met in 1938 at the Grand Prix de Rome, which Dutilleux won and at which Litaize finished second.

In The New York Times, Paul Griffiths wrote, "Mr. Dutilleux’s position in French music was proudly solitary. Between Olivier Messiaen and Pierre Boulez in age, he was little affected by either, though he took an interest in their work. … But his voice, marked by sensuously handled harmony and color, was his own."

Dutilleux received several major prizes throughout his career, notably the Grand Prix de Rome (1938), International Music Council's International Rostrum of Composers (1955), the Grand-Croix de la Légion d'honneur (2004), the Ernst von Siemens Music Prize (2005), the Gold Medal of the Royal Philharmonic Society (2008) and the Marie-Josée Kravis Prize for New Music (2011).

In addition to composing, he worked as the Head of Music Production for Radio France for 18 years. He also taught at the École Normale de Musique de Paris and at the Conservatoire National Supérieur de Musique, and was twice composer in residence at the Tanglewood Music Center in Lenox, Massachusetts.

Life
Henri Dutilleux was born on 22 January 1916 in Angers, Maine-et-Loire. He was the great-grandson of the painter Constant Dutilleux and grandson of the composer Julien Koszul. He was also a cousin of the mathematician Jean-Louis Koszul. He studied harmony, counterpoint, and piano with Victor Gallois at the Douai Conservatory before leaving for the Conservatoire de Paris. There, between 1933 and 1938, he attended the classes of Jean and Noël Gallon (harmony and counterpoint, in which he won joint first prize with the cellist Paul Tortelier), Henri Büsser (composition) and Maurice Emmanuel (history of music).

Dutilleux won the Prix de Rome in 1938 for his cantata L'anneau du roi but did not complete his entire residency in Rome due to the outbreak of World War II. He worked for a year as a medical orderly in the army and returned to Paris in 1940, where he worked as a pianist, arranger and music teacher. In 1942, he conducted the choir of the Paris Opera.

Dutilleux worked as Head of Music Production for Radio France from 1945 to 1963. He served as Professor of Composition at the École Normale de Musique de Paris from 1961 to 1970. He was appointed to the staff of the Conservatoire National Supérieur de Musique in 1970 and was composer-in-residence at Tanglewood in 1995 and 1998. His students included Gérard Grisey, Francis Bayer, Alain Gagnon, Jacques Hétu, and Kenneth Hesketh. Invited by Walter Fink, in 2006 he was the 16th composer featured in the Rheingau Musik Festival's annual Komponistenporträt.

For many years, Dutilleux had a studio on Île Saint-Louis. He died on 22 May 2013 in Paris, aged 97, and was buried in Montparnasse Cemetery, in the same grave as Geneviève, his wife who died in 2009. His tombstone is made of grey granite and bears the epitaph "Compositeur".

Influences and style
Dutilleux's music extends the legacies of French composers such as Debussy and Ravel but is also clearly influenced by Béla Bartók and Igor Stravinsky. Among his favourite pieces, he mentioned Beethoven's late string quartets and Debussy's Pelléas et Mélisande.

His attitude toward serialism was ambiguous. While he always paid attention to developments in contemporary music and incorporated some serialist techniques into his work, he also criticized the more radical and intolerant aspects of the movement: "What I reject is the dogma and the authoritarianism which manifested themselves in that period." Dutilleux refused to be associated with any school.

Dutilleux's music contains distant echoes of jazz, as can be heard in the plucked double bass strings at the beginning of his First Symphony and his frequent use of syncopated rhythms. He often calls for Ray Robinson-style cup mutes in the brass section, which seems to indicate the influence of big band music. Dutilleux was greatly enamoured of vocalists, especially the jazz singer Sarah Vaughan and the great French chanson singers.

Some of Dutilleux's trademarks include very refined orchestral textures; complex rhythms; a preference for atonality and modality over tonality; the use of pedal points that serve as atonal pitch centers; and "reverse variation", whereby a theme is revealed gradually, appearing in its complete form only after a few partial, tentative expositions. His music also displays a strong sense of structure and symmetry. This is particularly obvious from an "external" point of view, in the overall organisation of the different movements or the spatial distribution of the various instruments, but is also apparent in the music itself (themes, harmonies and rhythms mirroring, complementing or opposing each other). According to Stuart Jefferies, "A passage may be conceived as a symmetrical shape of notes on paper and only later given musical substance. He loves symmetrical musical figures such as palindromes or fan-shaped phrases".

Dutilleux's music was influenced by art and literature, such as the works of Vincent van Gogh, Charles Baudelaire and Marcel Proust. It also shows a concern for the concepts of time and memory, both in its use of quotations (notably from Bartók, Benjamin Britten, and Jehan Alain), and in short interludes that recall material used in earlier movements and/or introduce ideas that will be fully developed later.

A perfectionist with a strong sense of artistic integrity, he allowed only a small number of his works to be published; what he did publish he often repeatedly revised. In his own words:

Compositional history
Dutilleux numbered as Op. 1 his Piano Sonata (1946–1948), written for the pianist Geneviève Joy, whom he married in 1946. He renounced most of the works he composed before it because he did not believe them to be representative of his mature standards, considering many of them to be too derivative to have merit.

After the Piano Sonata, Dutilleux started working on his First Symphony (1951). It consists of four monothematic movements and has a perfectly symmetrical structure: music slowly emerges from silence (first movement—a passacaglia) and builds towards a fast climax (second—a scherzo and moto perpetuo), keeps its momentum (third—"a continuous melodic line that never goes back on itself"), and finally slowly fades out (fourth—a theme and variations).

In 1953, Dutilleux wrote the music for the ballet Le loup ("The Wolf").

In his Second Symphony, titled Le double (1959), the orchestra is divided into two groups: a small one at the front with instruments taken from the various sections (brass, woodwind, strings and percussion) and a bigger one at the back consisting of the rest of the orchestra. Although this brings to mind the Baroque concerto grosso, the approach is different: in this piece, the smaller ensemble acts as a mirror or ghost of the bigger one, sometimes playing similar or complementary lines, sometimes contrasting ones.

His next work, Métaboles for orchestra (1965) explores the idea of metamorphosis, how a series of subtle and gradual changes can radically transform a structure. A different section of the orchestra dominates each of the first four movements before the fifth brings them all together. As a result, it can be considered as a concerto for orchestra. It quickly achieved celebrity and, following its première by George Szell and the Cleveland Orchestra, was performed in several North American cities, then in France. Métaboles is one of his most often performed works.

In the 1960s, Dutilleux met Mstislav Rostropovich, who commissioned a cello concerto from him. Rostropovich premièred the work, Tout un monde lointain… (A whole distant world...), in 1970. It is considered one of Dutilleux's major achievements.

After the cello concerto, Dutilleux turned to chamber music for the first time in more than 20 years and wrote the string quartet Ainsi la nuit (1976). It consists of seven movements, some of which are linked by short "parentheses". The parentheses' function is to recall material that has already been heard and to introduce fragments that will be fully developed later. It is based on a hexachord (C–G–F–G–C–D) that highlights the intervals of fifth and major second. Each movement emphasizes various special effects (pizzicato, glissandi, harmonics, extreme registers, contrasting dynamics...), resulting in a difficult, elaborate work.

Dutilleux also published various works for piano (3 Préludes, Figures de résonances) and 3 strophes sur le nom de Sacher (1976–1982) for solo cello. The latter was originally composed on the occasion of Paul Sacher's 70th birthday in 1976, on a request by Rostropovich to write compositions for cello solo using his name spelt out in musical notes as the theme eS-A-C-H-E-Re (Es is E in German, H is B in German, and Re is D in French; see Sacher hexachord). He then returned to orchestral works in 1978 with Timbres, espace, mouvement ou la nuit etoilée, inspired by Van Gogh's The Starry Night. In this composition, Dutilleux attempted to translate into musical terms the opposition between emptiness and movement the painting conveys. It employs a string section of only lower-register instruments: cellos and basses, no violins or violas.

In 1985, Isaac Stern premiered L'arbre des songes (The Tree of Dreams), a violin concerto he had commissioned from Dutilleux. According to the composer, it is based on a process of continual growth and renewal: "All in all the piece grows somewhat like a tree, for the constant multiplication and renewal of its branches is the lyrical essence of the tree. This symbolic image, as well as the notion of a seasonal cycle, inspired my choice of 'L'arbre des songes' as the title of the piece."

Dutilleux's later works include Mystère de l'instant (for cymbalum, string orchestra and percussion, 1989), Les Citations (for oboe, harpsichord, double bass and percussion, 1991), The Shadows of Time (for orchestra and children voices, 1997), Slava's Fanfare (for Rostropovich's 70th birthday, 1997) and Sur le même accord (for violin and orchestra, 2002, dedicated to Anne-Sophie Mutter). In 2003, he completed Correspondances, a song cycle for soprano and orchestra inspired by poems and letters by Van Gogh, Prithwindra Mukherjee, Rainer Maria Rilke, and Aleksandr Solzhenitsyn. This work received a very enthusiastic reception and has been programmed several times since its première.

Dutilleux's last major work was the song cycle Le temps l'horloge, written for American soprano Renée Fleming. It consists of four pieces and an instrumental interlude on two poems by Jean Tardieu, one by Robert Desnos and one by Charles Baudelaire. The first three songs were premièred at the Saito Kinen Festival Matsumoto, Japan in September 2007. The American première of this partial version took place in November 2007 with the Boston Symphony Orchestra. The complete work was unveiled on 7 May 2009 at the Théâtre des Champs-Elysées in Paris.

In 2010, Dutilleux added a third movement to his chamber work Les citations. The expanded version was premiered at the Festival d’Auvers-sur-Oise.

In 2011, with Dutilleux's approval, Pascal Gallois transcribed three of his early vocal works for bassoon and piano: Regards sur l'Infini (from the early cycle for voice and piano Quatre mélodies) and Deux sonnets de Jean Cassou (originally for baritone and piano). He played them in a concert at the Hôtel de Lauzun in Dutilleux's presence.

Dutilleux allowed only a small fraction of his work to be published. He often expressed a wish to write more chamber music, notably a second string quartet, a piece for clarinet and ensemble, one for solo double bass, and more piano préludes. He long considered composing an opera but abandoned that project because he could not find a libretto that appealed to him.

Those who commissioned works from Dutilleux include Szell (Métaboles), Rostropovich (Tout un monde lointain… and Timbres, espace, mouvement), Stern (L'arbre des songes), Mutter (Sur le même accord), Charles Munch (Symphony No. 2 Le double), and Seiji Ozawa (The Shadows of Time and Le temps l'horloge).

Works
Dutilleux disowned many of the compositions he wrote before his Piano Sonata (1948). They are listed separately under Early works.

Orchestral
Symphony No. 1 (1951)
 Sérénades (1956; his contribution to Variations sur le nom de Marguerite Long)
Symphony No. 2 Le double (1959)
Métaboles (1964)
Timbres, espace, mouvement (1978)
Mystère de l'instant (1989)
The Shadows of Time, for three children's voices and orchestra (1997)
Slava's Fanfare for spatial ensemble (1997)

Concertante
Cello Concerto – Tout un monde lointain… [A whole distant world] (1970)
Violin Concerto – L'arbre des songes [The Tree of Dreams] (1985)
Nocturne for violin and orchestra Sur le même accord [On just one chord] (2002)

Chamber/instrumental
String Quartet – Ainsi la nuit [Thus the night] (1976)
Trois strophes sur le nom de Sacher [Three stanzas on the name Sacher] for solo cello (1976–1982)
Les citations for oboe, harpsichord, double bass and percussion (1985/1991/2010)
Regards sur l'Infini and Deux sonnets de Jean Cassou for bassoon and piano (1943/2011 and 1954/2011 – transcription of the vocal works)

Piano
 Tous les chemins mènent... à Rome [All roads lead to Rome] (1947)
 Bergerie (1947)
 Piano Sonata (1947–48):

 Blackbird (1950)
 Résonances (1965)
 Figures de résonances (1970) for two pianos
 Trois Préludes (1973–1988):
 D'ombre et de silence [In shadow and silence] (1973)
 Sur un même accord [On one chord] (1977)
 Le jeu des contraires [The game of opposites] (1988)
 Petit air à dormir debout [Little nonsensical air] (1981)

Vocal
Chansons de bord, for three children's voices (1952)
Deux sonnets de Jean Cassou, for baritone and piano or baritone and orchestra (1954)
Éloignez-vous for baritone and orchestra (1956)
San Francisco Night, for voice and piano (1963)
Hommage à Nadia Boulanger, for soprano, 3 violas, clarinet, percussion and zither (1967)
Correspondances, for soprano and orchestra (2003)
Le temps l'horloge, for soprano and orchestra (2007–2009)

Ballet
Le loup (1953)

Film scores 
 , by Henri Decoin (1946)
 Six Hours to Lose, by Alex Joffé and Jean Lévitte (1947)
 , by Jean Gehret (1947)
 , by Jean Gehret (1950)
 , by Jean Grémillon (1953)
 Under the Sun of Satan, by Maurice Pialat (1987)

Arrangements
Choral, cadence et fugato for trombone and symphonic band (1995 – same as the chamber work, orchestrated by Claude Pichaureau)
 Au gré des ondes, 6 petites pièces pour orchestre (2014 – orchestrated by Kenneth Hesketh, published by Leduc)
San Francisco Night, for voice and orchestra (2014 – orchestrated by Kenneth Hesketh, published by Leduc)
 Blackbird (1950) scored for Les Citations (instrumentation: oboe, harpsichord, percussion, double bass) by Kenneth Hesketh (2014, published by Billaudot)
 Mini-prélude en éventail (1987) scored for Les Citations (instrumentation: oboe, harpsichord, percussion, double bass) by Kenneth Hesketh (2016, unpublished)
 Sonate pour hautbois for oboe and orchestra (2019 – orchestrated by Kenneth Hesketh, published by Leduc)
 Sonatine pour flúte for flute and orchestra (2019 – orchestrated by Kenneth Hesketh, published by Leduc)
 Sarabande et cortège pour basson for bassoon and orchestra (2019 – orchestrated by Kenneth Hesketh, published by Leduc)

Early works
Dutilleux disowned most of the music he wrote before his Piano Sonata of 1948. Some of them are nonetheless played and recorded regularly, in particular the Sonatine for Flute and Piano.

Chamber/instrumental
Four Exam Pieces for the Paris Conservatoire (1942–1950)
Sarabande et cortège for bassoon and piano (1942)
Sonatine for Flute and Piano (1943)
Oboe Sonata (1947)
Choral, cadence et fugato for trombone and piano (1950)

Vocal
Barque d'or [The Golden Boat] for soprano and piano (1937)
Cantata L'anneau du roi [The King's Ring] (1938)
Quatre mélodies [Four Melodies] for voice and piano (1943)
La geôle [The Prison] for voice and orchestra (1944)

Piano
 Au gré des ondes, 6 petites pièces pour piano (1946) [Along the waves]:

Stature and tributes
After Dutilleux's death, the composer and conductor Laurent Petitgirard paid tribute to him as "one of the very rare contemporary composers" whose music became part of the repertoire in his lifetime, predicting that "[h]is work will remain intensely present after his death".

Several major musicians and conductors championed Dutilleux's works, notably Stern, Sacher, Mutter, Fleming, Ozawa, Munch, Szell, Rostropovich, Simon Rattle, and the Juilliard String Quartet.

The conductor and composer Esa-Pekka Salonen said of Dutilleux, "His production is rather small but every note has been weighed with golden scales... It's just perfect – very haunting, very beautiful. There’s some kind of sadness in his music which I find very touching and arresting."

The critic Tom Service wrote for the BBC, "Dutilleux's exquisite catalogue of pieces is becoming, rightly, ever more popular with performers and listeners all over the world".

An obituary in Gramophone commented, "Dutilleux represented a generation of musicians with roots almost back into the 19th century; certainly his music can be seen in a direct line from that of his great predecessors Debussy and Ravel." In an obituary in The Guardian, Roger Nichols described him as "the outstanding French composer between Messiaen and Boulez", adding that he "achieved a wholly individual synthesis of ear-catching colours and harmonies with formal rigour."

The Daily Telegraph said, "Because Dutilleux was a perfectionist and self-critical to a fault, his output was small. He wrote barely a dozen major works in his career, destroyed much of his early music and often revised what he had written. His early work was clearly derivative of Ravel, Debussy and Roussel; but his later music, though influenced by Bartok and Stravinsky, was entirely original and often seemed—in its scale—more German than French." The Daily Telegraph'''s critic Philip Hensher called Dutilleux "the Laura Ashley of music; tasteful, unfaultable, but hardly ever daring ... Personally, I can’t stick him."

Rob Cowan, the BBC Radio 3 presenter and critic, recalled in June 2013 an interview with Dutilleux in which he told Cowan that his personal favourite among his own works was Tout un monde lointain....

Awards and prizes
Grand Prix de Rome (for his cantata L'Anneau du Roi) – 1938
UNESCO's International Rostrum of Composers (for Symphony No. 1) – 1955
Grand Prix National de Musique (for his entire oeuvre) – 1967
Praemium Imperiale (Japan – for his entire oeuvre) – 1994
Prix MIDEM Classique de Cannes (for The Shadows of Time) – 1999
Grand-Croix de la Légion d'honneur – 2004
Ernst von Siemens Music Prize (for his entire oeuvre) – 2005
Prix MIDEM Classique de Cannes (for his entire oeuvre) – 2007
Cardiff University Honorary Fellowship (for his entire oeuvre) – 2008
Gold Medal of the Royal Philharmonic Society – 2008
Marie-Josée Kravis Prize for New Music – 2011

Honours
 Monaco : Commander of the Order of Saint-Charles (13 May 1998)
 France : Grand'Croix of the Légion d'honneur (31 December 2003)

Notes

References

 
 
 . Originally published as 
 
 
 
 Potter, Caroline. 1997. Henri Dutilleux: His Life and Works. Aldershot (UK) and Brookfield (Vermont, USA): Ashgate Publishing Company. .
  Quoted at 
 
 

Further reading
 May, Thomas. 2007.  [program notes]. Boston: Boston Symphony Orchestra (29 November) (archive from 19 July 2011).
 
 Rae, Caroline. 2000. "Henri Dutilleux and Maurice Ohana: Victims of an Exclusion Zone?" Tempo'', new series, 212 (April): 22–30.
 Swart, Bernarda. [2007]. "Proust's memory concept in Dutilleux's Sonata for Oboe and Piano (1947)" Brigham Young University Hawaii: Fine Arts website (accessed 19 June 2008).

External links

Henri Dutilleux's page at Theodore Presser Company 
Henri Dutilleux on The Living Composers Project
Henri Dutilleux's page on the Schott Music website
Dutilleux Centenary Website of the "Dutilleux Centenary", 2016
 
"Barque d'or"—an early Dutilleux song rediscovered Janet Obi-Keller, 2005
Henri Dutilleux classicalsource, articles on Dutilleux and CD and concert reviews
Dutilleux awarded prestigious RPS Gold Medal Schott news, 2008
Sidelined, But Not Forgotten LISTEN Magazine Spring 2010
Project "eSACHERe" 

1916 births
2013 deaths
People from Angers
French classical composers
French male classical composers
20th-century classical composers
21st-century classical composers
French ballet composers
Prix de Rome for composition
Recipients of the Praemium Imperiale
Honorary Members of the Royal Academy of Music
Conservatoire de Paris alumni
Academic staff of the Conservatoire de Paris
Academic staff of the École Normale de Musique de Paris
Royal Philharmonic Society Gold Medallists
Commanders of the Order of Saint-Charles
French military personnel of World War II
Pupils of Maurice Emmanuel
International Rostrum of Composers prize-winners
Ernst von Siemens Music Prize winners
Grand Croix of the Légion d'honneur
Burials at Montparnasse Cemetery
20th-century French composers
21st-century French composers
20th-century French male musicians
21st-century French male musicians